Peter Anthony Gooch (born 2 May 1949) is a former English cricketer.  Gooch was a left-handed batsman who bowled right-arm fast-medium.  He was born in Timperley, Cheshire.

Career
Gooch made his first-class debut for Lancashire against Oxford University in 1970.  He played 3 further first-class matches in 1970, the last coming against Glamorgan in the County Championship. In his 4 first-class matches for Lancashire, he took 6 wickets at bowling average of 42.00, with best figures of 4/52. A genuine tailender, Gooch failed to score in any of his first-class matches. It was for Lancashire that he made his List A debut against Gloucestershire in the 1970 Gillette Cup, his only List A appearance for the county.

The following season, having been released by Lancashire, he appeared in a single Minor Counties Championship match for Cheshire against the Lancashire Second XI, a team he had previously played for in the same competition. Five years later he joined Buckinghamshire who he represented in Minor counties cricket until 1979. While playing for Buckinghamshire, Gooch represented Minor Counties West in 4 List A matches in the 1978 Benson & Hedges Cup and Minor Counties South in 4 matches in the 1979 Benson & Hedges Cup. He only appeared once for Buckinghamshire in List A cricket, which was his final appearance in that format, against Suffolk in the 1979 Gillette Cup. In total, Gooch played 10 List A matches, taking 5 wickets at an expensive average of 63.60, with best figures of 3/51.

References

External links
Peter Gooch at ESPNcricinfo
Peter Gooch at CricketArchive

1949 births
Living people
People from Altrincham
English cricketers
Lancashire cricketers
Cheshire cricketers
Buckinghamshire cricketers
Minor Counties cricketers